Roger Abbott (July 10, 1946March 26, 2011) was an English-born Canadian sketch comedian who was a founding member of the long-lived Canadian comedy troupe Royal Canadian Air Farce, and remained one of its stars and writers until his death.

Early life
Abbott was born in Birkenhead, England; at age 7, he and his family moved to Montreal. While attending Loyola High School, he met Don Ferguson, who would become a co-star of Royal Canadian Air Farce. After graduation in 1963, he attended Loyola College (now Concordia University).

Career
Abbott began his career in behind-the-scene jobs in radio. In 1970, comedians John Morgan and Martin Bronstein, who were looking for non-actors who could write and perform their own material, convinced Abbott to join the cast of an improvisational theatre revue called The Jest Society (a pun on then-Prime Minister Pierre Trudeau's famous goal of making Canada a "Just Society"). After a number of personnel changes, the troupe — now consisting of Abbott, Morgan, Bronstein, Don Ferguson, Luba Goy and Dave Broadfoot— became known as the Royal Canadian Air Farce. On December 9, 1973, they began a weekly broadcast on CBC radio in front of a live audience at the CBC's Parliament Street studio in Toronto.  Abbott quickly showed his organizational abilities — Don Ferguson called him "the guiding light of Royal Canadian Air Farce" and "a combination of artistic, organizational and business talent". Abbott also became the "warm-up man" for the weekly broadcasts, chatting to the audience before introducing the rest of the cast. Abbott said the greatest influences on his style of comedy were Dave Broadfoot and the British comedy troupe Monty Python. Bronstein left the troupe the following year—the remaining members became the ongoing cast of Royal Canadian Air Farce for many years.

Air Farce branched into television in 1980 with a 10-week series of television shows for CBC, although they continued to produce their weekly radio show. About the same time, the producers of the American sitcom Taxi offered Abbott and Ferguson a chance to be writers on the show, but they turned the offer down.

In 1989, Abbott directed Huge Jumbo Comedy Thing, a show starring a troupe called the Maroons that CHOM-FM described as "Canada's answer to Monty Python".

For many years, Abbott and Don Ferguson co-hosted the annual televised Easter Seals Telethon.

In 1992, Royal Canadian Air Farce returned to television, this time as a weekly series, although the weekly radio series also continued to be produced until 1997. Abbott became well known for many roles on the television show, including parodies of Jean Chrétien, The Queen Mother, Yasser Arafat, Leonard Cohen, George W. Bush, Brian Williams, Peter Mansbridge, Don Newman, Craig Oliver, and "Native Persons Spokesman" Billy Two-Willies.

The title of the television show changed several times, first shortened to Air Farce, then to Air Farce Live, and in its final season (2008–2009), Air Farce Live—The Final Flight. Air Farce continued to produce occasional specials for CBC, and Abbott's last appearance on Air Farce was their New Year's Eve special that aired on December 31, 2010.

Death
Abbott was diagnosed with the progressive disease chronic lymphocytic leukemia in 1997, but only shared this fact with family and close friends.  After a 14-year battle, he succumbed to leukemia on March 26, 2011 at Toronto General Hospital at the age of 64.

Tributes
A video tribute to Abbott from his friends and colleagues at Royal Canadian Air Farce was posted on YouTube on March 27, 2011.
An hour-long tribute to Abbott, featuring many of his memorable sketches, aired on CBC Television on March 29, 2011.

A memorial service entitled "Roger's Wrap Party" was held in Toronto on April 11, 2011. Speakers included Jessica Holmes, Dave Broadfoot, Vicki Gabereau, Luba Goy, and Don Ferguson.
The Air Farce New Years Day special was dedicated to the memory of Roger Abbott.  A small segment was shown with the donut foursome sitting at the table with the also late John Morgan.  At the end of the special, the message "Dedicated to the Memory of Roger Abbott" appeared on screen.
In the episode 10, season 8 of The Big Bang Theory series that aired in November 20, 2014, the main characters go through the notes of a deceased professor called Roger Abbott.

Awards

 Gemini Humanitarian Award
 Governor General's Performing Arts Award for Lifetime Artistic Achievement
 15 ACTRA Awards
 a Juno Award
 a star on the Canada's Walk of Fame
 Honorary doctor of laws, Brock University, 1993

Footnotes

External links 
 
 Official biography, on the CBC RCAF website
 Concordia University Honorary Degree Citation, June 2009, Concordia University Records Management and Archives

1946 births
2011 deaths
Deaths from chronic lymphocytic leukemia
Canadian television personalities
British emigrants to Canada
People from Birkenhead
Royal Canadian Air Farce
Canadian radio personalities
Comedians from Montreal
Loyola College (Montreal) alumni
Governor General's Performing Arts Award winners
Canadian sketch comedians
Deaths from cancer in Ontario
20th-century Canadian comedians
21st-century Canadian comedians
Canadian male comedians
Canadian Comedy Award winners